A Woman There Was is a 1919 American silent South Seas drama film directed by J. Gordon Edwards and starring Theda Bara. The film is based on the short story "Creation's Tears", by George James Hopkins (under the name "Neje Hopkins"). Bara portrays Zara, the daughter of a South Seas island tribal chief, who falls in love with a missionary and is killed after helping him escape.

Plot
As described in a film magazine, Zara (Bara), daughter of tribal chief Majah (Ardizoni), is beloved by Pulke (Elliott), a pearl diver. When New England missionary Winthrop Stark (Davidson) arrives, Zara has no time for Pulke but offers her love to Stark, who refuses her as he expects to wed a girl back home. Pulke, jealous of the missionary, attempts to kill him with a spear but Zara shield him at risk to her life. When a typhoon hits the natives, to appease the gods, decide to offer Stark as a sacrifice, but again Zara saves him by offering herself in his place. She plunges into the ocean but is saved by the missionary before she drowns. As a result of his exertions, Stark lingers near death. Zara steals the sacred black pearl from the tomb of her father, who died during the storm, and with it Stark recovers. The natives stab Zara for taking the pearl, and once more she saves Stark, though dying herself, by returning the black pearl as payment for his safety.

Cast
 Theda Bara - Princess Zara
 William B. Davidson - Rev. Winthrop Stark
 Robert Elliott - Pulke
 Claude Payton - High Priest
 John Ardizoni - Majah

Production
A Woman There Was was filmed in Miami Beach, Florida, which at that time was often used as a substitute locale in South Seas films.

Reception
Compared to her earlier films, A Woman There Was was a commercial flop. Prior Fox films had typecast Bara as a vamp, and the public would not accept Bara in a non-vamp role in films such as A Woman There Was.

Preservation status
The studio prints of Bara's films were destroyed along with the rest of Fox's silent films in the 1937 Fox vault fire. With no copies of the film in any private collections or archives, A Woman There Was is now considered to be a lost film.

See also
List of lost films
1937 Fox vault fire

References

External links

A Woman There Was at silentera.com
Theda Bara during shooting of film A Woman There Was in Miami Beach, Florida, at floridamemory.com (photograph)
A Woman There Was (1919) at silenthollywood.com (several film stills)

1919 films
1919 romantic drama films
Fox Film films
American romantic drama films
American silent feature films
American black-and-white films
Films directed by J. Gordon Edwards
Films shot in Miami
Lost American films
1910s American films
Silent romantic drama films
Silent American drama films